The Beagle was an estate car conversion of the Bedford HA 8cwt van, which itself was based on the Vauxhall Viva HA. It was launched at the 1964 London Motor Show.

The conversions were undertaken by Martin Walter Ltd in Folkestone, Kent, most famous for Dormobile campers based upon the larger Bedford CA commercial vans. Whilst the vans were very common at one time, the Beagle was altogether rarer and there are very few left today.

The Beagle formed the basis of the Roma, a camper van that was marketed in standard and deluxe forms, both featuring standing headroom of 6 ft 5ins and a full length 6 ft double bed. A third bunk, fitted into the canopy of the elevated roof, is a feature of the deluxe version of the Roma.

Introduced in 1964, originally with the 1057 cc engine mated to a 4-speed gearbox, the Beagle was basic, with drum brakes all round and minimal interior trim. It was more or less replaced by the superior Viva HC estate cars.

References

Bedford vehicles
Rear-wheel-drive vehicles
Cars introduced in 1964